Rafu is a Japanese word. It may refer to:
 Rafoo Chakkar, a 1977 Hindi film
 "Rafu", a 2017 Hindi song by Santanu Ghatak for the film Tumhari Sulu
 Rafu Shimpo, a Japanese-English bilingual newspaper
 Rafu Telephone Guide, a Japanese-English bilingual telephone directory